Lung Wing Yan (born 11 July 1981) is a Hongkonger footballer who plays as a goalkeeper. She is also a futsal player, and represented Hong Kong internationally in both football and futsal.

International career 
Lung Wing Yan has been capped for Hong Kong at senior level in both football and futsal. In football, she represented Hong Kong at the 2014 AFC Women's Asian Cup qualification and the 2016 AFC Women's Olympic Qualifying Tournament.

In futsal, Lung Wing Yan played for Hong Kong at two AFC Women's Futsal Championship editions (2015 and 2018).

See also 
 List of Hong Kong women's international footballers

References

External links

1981 births
Living people
Hong Kong women's footballers
Women's association football goalkeepers
Hong Kong women's international footballers
Hong Kong women's futsal players
Futsal goalkeepers